COMS may refer to:

 3Com, a defunct digital electronics manufacturer
 Coms plc, a communications company
 City of Manchester Stadium